Day Guey-ing is a Taiwanese physician and politician. She was the deputy minister of the Department of Health in 2012–2013.

ROC Department of Health Deputy Ministry

Tobacco duty raise

Speaking at the Executive Yuan in early May 2013 in responding to the amendment by the cabinet to raise the tax and health and welfare surcharge on tobacco to help reduce Taiwanese who smoke, Day said that even when the Legislative Yuan approves the bill, it will not meet the standard set by the World Bank because the value is still less than standard. She said that an extra increase is needed to meet the standard. The extra revenues received would be used to fund various welfare projects around Taiwan.

References

Living people
21st-century Taiwanese politicians
Year of birth missing (living people)
21st-century Taiwanese women politicians
Women government ministers of Taiwan
Government ministers of Taiwan
Taiwanese women physicians